Alexander Basil Matthews (November 21, 1942 – September 22, 2018) was an American actor and singer, best known for his appearance as Gunnery Sergeant Apone in the James Cameron film Aliens (1986). He reprised his role 27 years later, providing the voice of Apone for the video game Aliens: Colonial Marines (2013). Matthews' portrayal of Apone was the inspiration for Sgt. Avery Johnson of the Halo franchise.

Military career
Matthews was a member of the United States Marine Corps who graduated at Parris Island on May 25, 1966, and served during the Vietnam War.  On his website, he stated:

I spent six years in the United States Marine Corps; I hold thirteen combat awards and decorations, including two purple hearts. I was the first black Marine in the 1st Marine Division in Vietnam to be meritoriously promoted to the rank of sergeant; I served with Kilo Battery, Fourth Battalion, 11th Marines, 1st Marine Division, of that I am very proud.

Acting and musical career
Matthews played various acting roles, such as Ferguson in Rough Cut (1980), a workman in Omen III: The Final Conflict (1981), a Vietnam veteran in The Sender (1982), a fire chief in Superman III (1983), Benedict in The American Way (1986), Sergeant Apone in Aliens (1986), General Tudor in The Fifth Element (1997) and Master Sergeant #3 in Tomorrow Never Dies (1997). He also worked in British television, appearing in Grange Hill as Sam Green, the father of Benny Green, as well as in theater and radio; for the latter, as both an actor (on BBC Radio 4) and a presenter (on BBC Radio 1 and Capital Radio). In 1975, he scored a musical hit in the UK Singles Chart, "Fool", which reached number 16 in the fall of that year.

Death
On September 22, 2018, Matthews was found unresponsive by a neighbor in his Orihuela, Spain home. He was later pronounced dead at age 75. Local reports claim he had battled severe illnesses over the years.

Filmography

See also

References

External links
 
 

1942 births
2018 deaths
20th-century American male actors
20th-century American singers
21st-century American male actors
African-American male actors
20th-century African-American male singers
African-American United States Navy personnel
African-American radio personalities
American male film actors
American male radio actors
American male television actors
American male video game actors
American male voice actors
American expatriate male actors in the United Kingdom
American expatriates in England
American expatriates in Spain
Male actors from New York City
Military personnel from New York City
Musicians from Brooklyn
Radio personalities from New York City
Singers from New York City
United States Marines
20th-century American male singers
United States Marine Corps personnel of the Vietnam War
21st-century African-American people
African Americans in the Vietnam War